Edwards County is a county located in the U.S. state of Illinois. As of the 2020 census, the population was 6,245. Its county seat is Albion.

History
Edwards County was named for Ninian Edwards, the governor of the Illinois Territory, and, later, governor of Illinois.

Edwards County is subdivided into "Road Districts", rather than "Townships" as in most Illinois counties.  Pursuant to the Land Ordinance of 1785, the Northwest Territory (including Illinois) was surveyed and mostly organized into townships that are six miles square; but Edwards County was settled prior to that survey, and its pre-existing Road Districts do not generally correspond with the survey's townships.

Geography
It is the fourth-smallest county in Illinois by area.

When Edwards County was formed in 1814, it comprised nearly half of the State of Illinois. New counties were formed from it until, in 1824, it assumed its present form from the creation of Wabash County. The two are the fourth and fifth smallest counties in Illinois.

Edwards County is separated from Wabash County by the Bonpas Creek.

Climate and weather

Major highways
  Illinois Route 1
  Illinois Route 15
  Illinois Route 130

Adjacent counties
 Richland County (north)
 Wabash County (east)
 White County (south)
 Wayne County (west)

Demographics

As of the 2010 United States Census, there were 6,721 people, 2,840 households, and 1,926 families residing in the county. The racial makeup of the county was 98.0% white, 0.4% black or African American, 0.3% Asian, 0.1% American Indian, 0.3% from other races, and 0.8% from two or more races. Those of Hispanic or Latino origin made up 0.9% of the population. In terms of ancestry, 26.8% were German, 22.4% were English, 13.3% were American, and 8.4% were Irish.

Of the 2,840 households, 28.9% had children under the age of 18 living with them, 54.8% were married couples living together, 8.3% had a female householder with no husband present, 32.2% were non-families, and 28.5% of all households were made up of individuals. The average household size was 2.35 and the average family size was 2.86. The median age was 42.7 years.

The median income for a household in the county was $40,430 and the median income for a family was $51,337. Males had a median income of $40,183 versus $27,295 for females. The per capita income for the county was $21,113. About 10.6% of families and 12.2% of the population were below the poverty line, including 17.1% of those under age 18 and 12.3% of those age 65 or over.

Communities

Cities
 Albion (seat)
 Grayville (Partially in White County)

Villages
 Bone Gap
 Browns
 West Salem

Unincorporated Communities
 Bennington
 Black
 Ellery
 Maple Grove
 Marion
 Red Top
 Samsville

Precincts 
Edwards County is divided into 12 election precincts:

 Albion No. 1
 Albion No. 2
 Albion No. 3
 Bone Gap
 Browns
 Dixon
 Ellery
 French Creek
 Salem No. 1
 Salem No. 2
 Shelby No. 1
 Shelby No. 2

Politics
Edwards County is one of the most consistently Republican counties in the nation. It has voted for the Republican candidate in all Presidential elections from 1856 to present, except in 1912 when the party was divided and Theodore Roosevelt won the county as the “Bull Moose” Progressive candidate. In the last five Presidential elections no Democratic candidate has reached 34 percent of the county's vote.  Edwards County also holds the distinction of having the lowest percentage of any Illinois county of votes for governor Pat Quinn, a Democrat, in his failed 2014 reelection bid. Quinn lost 101 of the 102 counties in Illinois, capturing only 13.7% of the vote in Edwards County. Hillary Clinton fared even worse in 2016 with only 13.1 percent of the county's ballots.

In other positions the county has been not been consistently Republican for as long, but nevertheless has been so for many years. The last Democratic Senatorial candidate it backed was Alan J. Dixon in 1986 and the last Democratic gubernatorial candidate it supported was Glenn Poshard, who carried all of Southern Illinois in his failed 1998 bid. Edwards County lies in Illinois's 15th congressional district, which has Cook Partisan Voting Index of R+21 and has been represented by Republican Mary Miller since 2021. In more local positions the county is in the 109th district of the Illinois House of Representatives so is represented by Republican Darren Bailey and is in the Illinois Senate it lies in the 55th district and is represented by Republican Dale Righter.

Edwards County is a dry county, with multiple referendums to allow alcohol sales failing in the mid-1990s. The portion of Grayville, Illinois that lies within Edwards County does allow alcohol sales per Grayville city ordinance.

References
 United States Census Bureau 2007 TIGER/Line Shapefiles
 United States Board on Geographic Names (GNIS)
 United States National Atlas

External links
 Edwards County precincts and their boundaries

 
Illinois counties
1814 establishments in Illinois Territory
Populated places established in 1814
Edwards County, Illinois
Pre-statehood history of Illinois